Rajaneegandhi is a 1980 Indian Malayalam film,  directed by M. Krishnan Nair and produced by N. G. John. The film stars Madhu, Lakshmi, Adoor Bhasi and Jose in the lead roles. The film has musical score by G. Devarajan.

Cast

Madhu as Dr. Gopinath
Lakshmi as Sumathy
Adoor Bhasi as Krishna Menon
Jose as Murali
Manavalan Joseph as Nanu Pillai
Sreelatha Namboothiri as Bharathi
Prathapachandran as Vasu Menon
Kundara Johny
Kuthiravattam Pappu as Bharathi's husband d'Costa
P. R. Menon
Paravoor Bharathan as Shivaraman Nair
Ravikumar as Krishnakumar
Sharmila as Mallika
Shobhana (Roja Ramani) as Usha
Silk Smitha as Sheela

Soundtrack
The music was composed by G. Devarajan and the lyrics were written by Yusufali Kechery.

References

External links
 

1980 films
1980s Malayalam-language films
Films directed by M. Krishnan Nair